Sanjiao may refer to:

San Jiao, term in traditional Chinese medicine
Sanjiao, Meizhou, town Meizhou, Guangdong, China
Sanjiao, Zhongshan, town in Zhongshan, Guangdong, China
Three teachings, or sanjiao in pinyin, Confucianism, Taoism, and Buddhism when considered as a harmonious aggregate